In American English, a journeyman or journeywoman is an athlete who is technically competent but unable to excel. The term is used elsewhere (such as in British and Australian contexts) to refer to a professional sportsman who plays for numerous clubs during his career. In Britain, the term is also used derogatorily, along with mercenary, to refer to players who join various affluent clubs purely in search of higher contractual payouts rather than to further their career; usually clubs which they would likely never join otherwise.

American English

Journeymen often make up a significant part of the roster of even the richest clubs because of the difficulty of guaranteeing all of their star players sufficient playing time. This is especially true in the context of baseball, where journeymen often make up large parts of a team's pitching staff and contribute crucially to a team's success. Many journeymen can be highly experienced, and they often play a "utility" role to cover for injuries or tactical changes as required.

Journeymen players are usually distinguished from an elite or "star" player. Quirk and Fort note that the concerns of journeymen players and superstars, with respect to contract and other negotiations, differ: Superstars are concerned with the preservation of their rights to be free agents, whilst journeymen players are concerned with issues such as league minimum salaries and player pensions. Fort observes that this leads to conflicts between journeymen and superstars, such as (Fort's example) the 1995 attempt by a group of superstar players to derail the agreement between the NBA and its players' association. Holt and Mason note that in football, golf, flat racing, snooker, cricket, and other sports there is a clear distinction in earnings between the few rich stars in each sport and the journeyman professionals. They state that snooker has "an élite of perhaps twenty players" and point to a distinction between high earning test cricketers with six figure wages and "the average county professional" (for whom they give Simon Hughes, who earned £50,000 in the whole of his twelve years in county cricket, as an example). Vamplew describes how league cricket in the 1890s provided little attraction for star cricketers but was greatly attractive to journeymen players in county cricket, eventually forcing the counties to raise their conventional maximum wage, offer winter pay to more players, and expand the fixture lists.

O'Leary notes as significant the fact that whilst star football players will be treated with lenience by clubs, for journeyman footballers the taking of recreational drugs usually terminates their careers. (He gives Roger Stanislaus and Craig Whitington as examples.) Clubs will regard it as worthwhile to wait for stars to become available for team selection after suspension or imprisonment, but not for journeymen.

American football
In American football, Marc Sessler on NFL.com described the definition of a journeyman quarterback as "hazy".  He limited his discussion in the article to quarterbacks who had played for four or more teams in the National Football League and occasionally others such as the Canadian Football League with "impactful, memory-spinning moments along the way", despite not being considered among the best quarterbacks in the league. Players described as such include Doug Flutie, Vinny Testaverde, Kyle Orton, Steve DeBerg, Ryan Fitzpatrick, Josh McCown, and Josh Johnson. Despite the occasionally pejorative connotation associated with the term, some journeyman quarterbacks such as Flutie and Testaverde have had spurts of postseason success, with others such as Trent Dilfer, Brad Johnson and Nick Foles winning the Super Bowl. Foles was named to the Pro Bowl in 2013 before being voted  the Super Bowl LII MVP in 2018.

Boxing, kickboxing and mixed martial arts

In boxing, kickboxing and mixed martial arts, a journeyman is a fighter who has adequate skill, but is not of the caliber of a contender or gatekeeper. Journeymen typically serve as opponents for young up-and-coming prospects and will often step in on short notice should a scheduled fighter get injured or be otherwise unavailable for a bout. While no match for contenders, they may still have a winning record against less-skilled fighters.

In testimony to the United States Senate Committee on Commerce, Science, and Transportation, DeGuardia states that becoming a journeyman is the fate of many professional boxers, and that a boxer will realize that he has become a journeyman "after about 10 years" in the profession.  Journeymen boxers float "from promoter to promoter, or manager to manager, hoping to get placed as opponents in fights" by promoters. They will "fight all the time, anywhere, in order to make enough money to get by." In earlier testimony to the committee, it had been reported that some journeymen boxers regard themselves as existing in the sport solely as "a body for better men to beat on."

Svinth reports that the activities of journeymen boxers changed over the course of the 20th century, with journeymen of the 1920s fighting a couple of times per week and spending little time in the gymnasium, but journeymen of the 1990s fighting a couple of times per year and sparring in the gymnasium three or four nights per week.

Quotes

British English
thumb|upright|Lutz Pfannenstiel played for 27 clubs on six continents. 
In British English, a journeyman is a player who has represented many clubs over his career. Prime examples from association football are: German goalkeeper Lutz Pfannenstiel, who represented 27 clubs, and he is currently the only athlete to have played professionally in all six FIFA Confederations; Trevor Benjamin, who has represented 29 clubs since 1995; Drewe Broughton, who has made 18 transfers in his career; John Burridge, who played for 29 clubs in a career spanning almost 30 years; Jefferson Louis who, since the 1990s, has represented 34 clubs and Dominica once; his cousin Richard Pacquette who boasts 19 clubs and even international honours in 10 seasons; and Sebastián Abreu, who in 2017 broke the world record for most clubs played by a professional; as of 2021, at the age of 44, he is playing for the 31st club in his career.

The term is also used in Australian English and New Zealand English in the same context, with the added idiom of "recycling" for the tendency for the clubs in the relatively small structure of Australian football to continually rotate the same experienced, professional, but generally unspectacular players around the league to fill gaps in the club squads. An example of such "recycling" is found with Antony Golec, who has played for 7 of the 12 current A-League clubs, never staying with one for more than 3 seasons in a row.

The term is also used derogatorily, along with mercenary, to refer to players who join various affluent clubs purely in search of higher contractual payouts, clubs which they would likely never join otherwise.

In contrast, players who represent the same club throughout their entire careers are called one-club men.

References

External links
List of international journeyman footballers

Terminology used in multiple sports